= Sydney City =

Sydney City or Sydney city may refer to:

- Sydney, the largest city in Australia
- Sydney central business district, the central city area in Sydney, Australia
- City of Sydney, the municipal council responsible for central Sydney, Australia
- Hakoah Sydney City East FC, a soccer club formerly competing in the Australian National Soccer League
- Sydney, Nova Scotia, a community in Canada formerly a city (1904–1995)
